Douglas Clifford Cherry (September 22, 1932 – June 16, 2016) was a Canadian politician from Alberta. He served as a member of the Legislative Assembly of Alberta from 1986 to 1993.

Political career
Born in Ladner, British Columbia in 1932, Cherry ran as a Progressive Conservative candidate in the 1986 Alberta general election he won a two-way race over NDP candidate Gary McCorquodale to win the electoral district of Lloydminster.  In the 1989 Alberta general election, Cherry easily defeating two other candidates to win his second term in office. During his time in office Cherry helped to establish Lakeland College. Cherry retired from provincial politics at dissolution of the legislature in 1993.

Aside from politics, Doug Cherry was a member of the Canadian Armed Forces and served in the Korean War. In between the war and the Alberta Legislature, Doug became a farmer and a councillor for the town of Lloydminster. He died on June 16, 2016 at the age of 83.

References

External links
Legislative Assembly of Alberta Members Listing

1932 births
2016 deaths
Progressive Conservative Association of Alberta MLAs